Paap (English: Sin) is a Bengali family drama-murder mystery directed by Anupam Hari which started streaming on popular Bengali OTT platform hoichoi from 2 October 2019. The series stars Puja Banerjee who made her debut in Bengali web series through this web series. The series also features Saheb Bhattacharya, Solanki Roy, Rahul Banerjee, Ishani Das, Rajat Ganguly, Bhaswar Chattopadhyay, Rupsa Dasgupta, Priyanka Mondal, Indrajit Chakraborty in the key roles.
Durga Puja is the most important festival for Bengalis, where all the family members meet and enjoy this precious festival together. The actual meaning of the Bengali word ‘Paap’ is ‘Sin’. The series is based on an ancient Durga Puja celebration of a family, where all members and relatives of the family have come to become a part of the celebration. Meanwhile, an unwanted guest comes who had a mysterious past life and have some long-kept secrets about the family. At the same time, two dead bodies are discovered in the house and the puja house becomes a crime scene and there are many mysteries to unveil.

Cast 
Puja Banerjee as Parboni 'Paru'/ Rubina
Saheb Bhattacharya as Chhoton Chowdhury
Rahul Banerjee as Inspector Monojit Halder/Nabin Chandra Das
Ishani Das as young Paru
Bhaswar Chattopadhyay as Srimonto Chowdhury 'Tublu' aka Mejda
Solanki Roy / Mishmee Das as Tiya Chowdhury
Roopsha Dasgupta as Bidisha Chowdhury
Priyanka Mondal as Sneha
Angana Royy
Indrajit Chakraborty as Dhiman Chowdhury'Bablu' aka Borda
Rajat Ganguly as Baikunto Chowdhury aka Natun Mesho

Episodes

Season 1 (2019)
On 28 September 2019 on the day of Mahalaya, hoichoi released the trailer of the series.Paap was released on 2 October 2019 with five episodes.

Season 1 Episodes

Season 2 (2021)
On 4 June 2021 hoichoi released the second season of the original web series. The second season has been called as the "Antim Pawrbo" (Last Chapter). In this season hoichoi released five new episodes. In this season, the cast almost remained  same like the first season except Tiya, which is now played by Mishmee Das while Solanki Roy in first. Also, this time the season is directed by Joydeep Mukherjee.

Season 2 Episodes

References

External links

Indian web series
2017 web series debuts
Bengali-language web series
Hoichoi original programming